is a Japanese sport shooter who competed in the 1972 Summer Olympics, in the 1976 Summer Olympics and in the 1984 Summer Olympics.

References

1939 births
Living people
Japanese male sport shooters
ISSF pistol shooters
Olympic shooters of Japan
Shooters at the 1972 Summer Olympics
Shooters at the 1976 Summer Olympics
Shooters at the 1984 Summer Olympics
Shooters at the 1974 Asian Games
Shooters at the 1982 Asian Games
Shooters at the 1986 Asian Games
Asian Games medalists in shooting
Asian Games silver medalists for Japan
Asian Games bronze medalists for Japan
Medalists at the 1974 Asian Games
Medalists at the 1982 Asian Games
Medalists at the 1986 Asian Games
20th-century Japanese people